Chhajjian (Urdu - Hindko چھجیاں) is a valley in Haripur District in Khyber Pakhtunkhwa province of Pakistan. It is located South East of the District Haripur at ). It is surrounded by pine-covered mountains which are rich in wildlife.

The Chajian Waterfall is on the outskirts of Chhajjian.

References 

Haripur District